Joseph Caullé (3 May 1885 – 1 October 1915) was a French middle-distance runner who specialised in the 800 metres. He competed in the men's 800 metres event at the 1912 Summer Olympics. He was killed in action during World War I.

See also
 List of Olympians killed in World War I

References

1885 births
1915 deaths
French male middle-distance runners
Sportspeople from Seine-Maritime
Athletes (track and field) at the 1912 Summer Olympics
Olympic athletes of France
French military personnel killed in World War I